A solar-powered watch or light-powered watch is a watch that is powered entirely or partly by a solar cell.

History 
A model produced from 1978 by the Riehl Time Corporation was simply described as running on solar power, but having "silicon power cells" that "absorb energy from natural sunlight, daylight, or an ordinary light bulb".

Some of the early solar watches of the 1970s had innovative and unique designs to accommodate the array of photovoltaic solar cells needed to power them (Synchronar, Nepro, Sicura and some models by Cristalonic, Alba, Rhythm, Seiko and Citizen). In 1996, Citizen started to sell analog light-powered watches under the Eco-Drive name. Since their introduction, photovoltaic devices have greatly improved their efficiency and thereby their capacity. Watchmakers have developed their technology such that solar-powered watches had by 2009 become a major part of their range. Several other watch manufacturers also use solar technology, such as Orient. Junghans, Casio, and Seiko.

Inexpensive solar-powered watches were first sold in the 1980s and were popular amongst children, often featuring famous fictional characters such as Transformers or G.I. Joe.

Technological details 

Typically, sunlight and artificial light are absorbed by a solar panel behind the crystal. The dial is either on a layer above or actually on the solar panel. This solar panel converts the light into electrical energy to power the watch. The watch will usually store energy in a rechargeable cell to power itself during the night or when covered such as a wearer's clothing (e.g., sleeve). Citizen's watches use lithium-ion batteries to store sufficient energy to power the watch for up to five years without light exposure, by allowing the watch to enter a power-saving or hibernation mode during which the seconds hand stops until the watch is re-exposed to light. Not all have a power-save mode, yet will still hold a charge for typically six months, as with uncomplicated (date only) analog versions made by Citizen.

References

Applications of photovoltaics
Solar-powered devices
Watches
Photovoltaics